Harald of Denmark - may refer to:
Harald I of Denmark, better known as Harald Bluetooth
Harald II of Denmark
Harald III of Denmark
Harold Harefoot
Harald Kesja
Prince Harald of Denmark
Harald Skrænk, pretender to the Danish throne, alleged illegitimate son of Olaf (II) Haraldsen